Paul Edwin Menoher Jr. (20 July 1939 – 7 September 2020) was a U.S. Army officer.

Menoher earned a bachelor of arts degree in political science from the University of California, Berkeley in 1961 and later received a master's degree in international relations from George Washington University.

From 15 September 1989 to 27 July 1993, Menoher, served as Chief of the Military Intelligence Corps, commanding AIA and later the U.S. Army Intelligence Center in Fort Huachuca, AZ.  

On 12 August 1993, Major General Menoher became the Commanding General, U.S. Army Intelligence and Security Command.

From February 1995 to February 1997, Lieutenant General Menoher served as Deputy Chief of Staff for Intelligence (DCSINT), Headquarters, Department of the Army.

Menoher was a member of the Military Intelligence Hall of Fame.

Menoher died on 7 September 2020 after a brief illness. He was interred at Arlington National Cemetery on 26 March 2021.

Awards and decorations
Menoher's awards include:
Military Intelligence Hall of Fame
Menoher's military decorations include:
Distinguished Service Medal (2)
Legion of Merit (3)
Bronze Star (2)
Meritorious Service Medal (4)
Army Commendation Medal

College Sports
Menoher played college baseball as a pitcher for the California Golden Bears of the University of California, Berkeley.

References

1939 births
2020 deaths
California Golden Bears baseball players
University of California, Berkeley alumni
United States Army personnel of the Vietnam War
Recipients of the Meritorious Service Medal (United States)
Elliott School of International Affairs alumni
Recipients of the Legion of Merit
United States Army generals
Recipients of the Distinguished Service Medal (US Army)
Burials at Arlington National Cemetery